Carola Malvina López (born 17 April 1982) is an Argentine taekwondo practitioner. At the 2012 Summer Olympics, she competed in the Women's 49kg competition, but was defeated in the quarter finals.

References

Argentine female taekwondo practitioners
1982 births
Living people
Olympic taekwondo practitioners of Argentina
Taekwondo practitioners at the 2012 Summer Olympics
21st-century Argentine women